Gain-ground games are team sports which are played with a small ball or a balloon. They are often outdoors on a "ballodrome" but can also be played indoors.

Among these games, longue paume and real tennis are the most well-known because they are played with rackets. The rules change a little depending on the game, but the basic rules remain identical from one game to the other.

Games of gain-ground are characterized in particular by the use of "chasses". Chasses indicate the limit between both teams or in real tennis a limit to score a point. Points are counted as in tennis: 15, 30, 40 and set.

Games of gain-ground 

Two games in Jeu de paume:
 Real tennis
 longue paume
These sports are practised in Hauts-de-France and Belgium:
 Ballon au poing
 Balle à la main
 Balle pelote
 Balle au tamis
but also in Spain :
 Llargues, 
or in the world:
 International game

Sources 
  Benoît Goffin, LA BALLE PELOTE au cœur de notre région, éd. Aparté, Namur, 2006. .
  Marcel Lazure,  Les jeux de balle et ballon picards: ballon au poing, balle à la main, balle au tamis, longue paume, Centre régional de documentation pédagogique de Picardie, Amiens, France, 1996.
  Marcel Lazure, Les jeux de balle et ballon picards, Sports de France, Amiens, p. 96. , (1981)
  Luc Collard, Longue paume et ballon au poing, revue EPS, n° 274, p. 72-75, nov-déc 1998
  H. Civilio, Le jeu de balle en Belgique, Louvain, ( Mémoire en Education physique, Université Catholique de Louvain ), (1966)

Notes

External links 
 Confédération Internationale du Jeu de Balle (C.I.J.B.)

 
Ball games
Team sports
Sports originating in France